Buff is a nickname of:

 E. U. Curtis Bohlen (born 1927), former president of the World Wildlife Fund and former United States Assistant Secretary of State for Oceans and International Environmental and Scientific Affairs
 Aldo Donelli (1907–1994), American football player and college and National Football League head coach, soccer player and college athletics administrator
 Buff Hardie, a member of the Scotland the What? comedy review act
 Geoff Hoon (born 1953), British politician
 Charles Kirkland (born 1950), American retired basketball player
 Buff Lord (1892–1985), English rugby league footballer
 Bob McCready (1940–2007), Canadian box lacrosse goaltender
 Buff Milner (1946–1996), New Zealand rugby union player
 Buff Wagner (born 1897), American football player

See also
 BUFF (Big Ugly Fat Fucker/Fella), a nickname of the Boeing B-52 Stratofortress bomber aircraft

Lists of people by nickname